For the Jay-Z song, see I Just Wanna Love U (Give It 2 Me).

"I Just Want to Love You" is a song co-written and recorded by American country music artist Eddie Rabbitt.  It was released in October 1978 as the third single from the album Variations.  The song was Rabbitt's third number one on the country chart.  The single stayed at number one for a week and spent a total of eleven weeks on the chart.  It was written by Rabbitt, Even Stevens and David Malloy.

Chart performance

References

1978 songs
Eddie Rabbitt songs
1978 singles
Songs written by Eddie Rabbitt
Songs written by David Malloy
Song recordings produced by David Malloy
Elektra Records singles
Songs written by Even Stevens (songwriter)